Ivan Aleksandrovich Kuzmichyov (born 20 October 2000) is a Russian football player who plays as a centre-back for FC Lokomotiv Moscow.

Club career
He made his debut in the Russian Premier League for FC Ural Yekaterinburg on 16 May 2021 in a game against FC Lokomotiv Moscow. He substituted Andrei Yegorychev in the 81st minute.

On 7 September 2022, Kuzmichyov signed a four-year contract with FC Lokomotiv Moscow.

Career statistics

References

External links
 
 

2000 births
Sportspeople from Tolyatti
Living people
Russian footballers
Russia under-21 international footballers
Association football defenders
FC Lada-Tolyatti players
FC Ural Yekaterinburg players
FC Lokomotiv Moscow players
Russian Second League players
Russian Premier League players